NEDD4-like E3 ubiquitin-protein ligase WWP1 is an enzyme that in humans is encoded by the WWP1 gene.

Function 

WW domain-containing proteins are found in all eukaryotes and play an important role in the regulation of a wide variety of cellular functions such as protein degradation, transcription, and RNA splicing. This gene encodes a protein which contains 4 tandem WW domains and a HECT (homologous to the E6-associated protein carboxyl terminus) domain. The encoded protein belongs to a family of NEDD4-like proteins, which are E3 ubiquitin-ligase molecules and regulate key trafficking decisions, including targeting of proteins to proteosomes or lysosomes. Alternative splicing of this gene generates at least 6 transcript variants; however, the full length nature of these transcripts has not been defined. In neurons, murine ortholog Wwp1 and its homolog Wwp2 control polarity acquisition, formation, and branching of axons, as well as migration of newly born nerve cells into the cortical plate.

Interactions 

WWP1 has been shown to interact with:
 CPSF6,
 KLF2,  and
 Reticulon 4

References

Further reading